Accola is a surname. Notable people with the surname include:

Candice King (née Accola) (born 1987), American actress and singer
Martina Accola (born 1969), Swiss alpine skier
Paul Accola (born 1967), Swiss alpine skier

See also
Masteria, genus of spiders formerly known as Accola